Ministry of Veterans Affairs may refer to:
 Ministry of Veterans Affairs (China)
 Ministry for Veterans Affairs (Ukraine)
Ministry of Croatian Veterans